The Chamundi Hills are located 13 km east of Mysore, Karnataka, India. The name comes from the Chamundeshwari Temple at the peak.

Attractions

The Chamundeshwari Temple is located atop the Chamundi Hills. Patronised for centuries by Mysore rulers, it was renovated during the time of Krishnaraja Wodeyar III (1827).

Temple 

Named after the Goddess Chamundi, the Chamundeshwari Temple sits atop the main hill. The main hill itself features an ancient stone stairway of 1,008 steps leading to its summit. Approximately halfway to the summit is statue of bull Nandi, the vahana, or "vehicle" of Lord Shiva, which is 4.9 m tall and 7.6 m long and carved out of a single piece of black granite. Around this point, the steps become significantly less steep and eventually the climber is rewarded with a panoramic view of the city.

The Temple has a quadrangular structure. A key feature is the statue of Mahishasura bearing a sword in his right hand and a cobra in the left. Within the temple's sanctum stands a sculpted depiction of Chamundeshwari. She is seated with her right heel pressed against the lowest of the seven chakras. This cross-legged yogic posture echoes the posture of Lord Shiva. Worshipers believe that this powerful yogic posture, if mastered, provides an added dimensional view of the universe.

During the rule of Wadiyars of Mysore, the Maharaja was seated in the golden howdah atop the elephant during Vijayadashami (tenth day of Dasara) procession. Post-independence, the Maharaja was replaced by an idol of Chamundeshwari, while the Dasara into a State festival.

From the peak of the Chamundi hills, the Mysore Palace, the Karanji Lake and several smaller temples are visible.

Legend
According to a legend, the asura Mahishasura (king of the city that is currently known as Mysore) was killed by goddess Chamundeswari (also called Chamundi) after a fierce battle. The goddess is also called Mahishasura Mardini. 

According to mythology, this rocky hill was known as Mahabalachala. Two ancient temples occupy the hill, the Mahabaleshvara and the Chamundeshvari; the Mahabaleshvara Temple on the hill is the older of the two and is a place of pilgrimage. The car festival and 'Teppotsava' are held there.

The influence on the name of Mysuru
The name of Mysuru comes from the old Kannada word "Mahishooru". Mahishooru literally means 'the village of Mahishasura.' The British then modified this name to 'Mysore'. Then, on 1 November 2014, the government of Karnataka changed the name to 'Mysuru'. The hill thus has an indirect influence on the name of the city

See also 
 Lalithadripura

References

External links 

Mysore Nature|Chamundi Hill Reserve Forest
Mysore Chamundi Temple
Climbing Chamundi Hill; 1001 Steps with a Storyteller and a Reluctant Pilgrim.  Ariel Glucklich

Mysore South
Tourist attractions in Mysore
Hills of Karnataka
Hill stations in Karnataka
Geography of Mysore district
Tourist attractions in Mysore district
Suburbs of Mysore